Louis III may refer to:

 Louis the Younger, sometimes III of Germany (835–882)
 Louis III of France (865–882)
 Louis the Blind, Louis III, Holy Roman Emperor, (c. 880–928)
 Louis the Child, sometimes III of Germany (893–911)
 Louis III, Count of Chiny (died 1189)
 Ludwig III of Thuringia (ruled 1172–1190), see Hermann I, Landgrave of Thuringia
 Louis III of Châtillon (died 1391)
 Louis III of Naples (1403–1434)
 Louis III, Elector Palatine (ruled 1410–1436)
 Louis III, Landgrave of Hesse, nicknamed "the Frank" (1438–1471)
 Louis III, Count of Löwenstein (1530–1611)
 Louis III, Duke of Württemberg (1554–1593)
 Louis III, Cardinal of Guise (1575–1621)
 Louis III, Prince of Condé (1668–1710)
 Ludwig III, Grand Duke of Hesse and by Rhine (1806–1877)
 Ludwig III of Bavaria (1845–1921)